is a Japanese manga artist. Some of his major works include Goth, Welcome to the N.H.K., a one-shot, Tsukumo Happy Soul published in Monthly Shōnen Ace, Kadokawa Shoten's manga magazine, and the manga serialization of Assassin's Creed IV: Black Flag.

References

External links 
 Kenji Oiwa at Media Arts Database 
 

Manga artists
Living people
Year of birth missing (living people)